Inés Córdova Suárez (1927 – 19 May 2010) was a Bolivian artist.

Biography
In the 1960s she developed new collage techniques incorporating textiles and metal.

The artist Gil Imaná confirmed the death of Córdova, who had been his wife for 46 years, on 19 May 2010 in La Paz.

This included a property in Sopocachi (on Aspiazu and 20 de Octubre Streets) and several collections comprising approximately 6,000 pieces. One half corresponds to work in ceramics, sculpture, and painting by Córdova and by Imaná himself. The other belongs to collections of contemporary painting by Bolivian and Latin American artists, colonial objects, ceramics, and pre-Hispanic Andean weavings.

Murals
 1965, Mural in ceramic, Engineering Faculty of UMSA (together with Gil Imaná)
 1981, Tránsito en el tiempo, Mutual "La Primera"
 1985, Telúrica americana, panel mural enriched with textiles at OAS headquarters in Washington, D.C.

Awards and distinctions
 1973, Second Prize in painting from Salón Murillo with the work Rojo sol altiplano, La Paz
 2004, "Obra de vida" Award from Salón Murillo, La Paz
 2004, National Culture Award, La Paz

References

1927 births
2010 deaths
20th-century Bolivian painters
21st-century Bolivian women artists
20th-century Bolivian women artists
Bolivian sculptors
Bolivian women sculptors
Collage artists
Women collage artists
Muralists
People from Potosí
Potters
Women muralists
Bolivian women painters
Women potters
Bolivian women ceramists